The Bride Wore Red is a 1937 American drama film directed by Dorothy Arzner, and starring Joan Crawford, Franchot Tone, Robert Young and Billie Burke. It was based on the unproduced play The Bride from Trieste by Ferenc Molnár. In this "rags to riches" tale, Crawford plays a cabaret singer who poses as an aristocrat. This film is the last of the seven films that Crawford and co-star Franchot Tone, then her husband, made together.

Plot
In a Trieste casino, the cynical Count Armalia (George Zucco) tells his friend Rudi Pal (Robert Young) that life is “a great roulette wheel”. Luck is the only thing separating aristocrats and waiters.. Later, in “the lowest dive in Trieste” he tells Rudi that if he had one of the girls “washed, dressed and coiffured” Rudi could not tell the difference between one of the “poor things” (prostitution is implied) and his fiancée. Rudi leaves, and the Count decides to prove his point. He offers the singer, Anni Pavlovitch (Joan Crawford), money, a wardrobe and a two-week stay at Terrano, an elegant resort in the Tyrol. She will be Anne Vivaldi, the fictional daughter of a fictional naval officer. Anni's one condition: a red evening dress.

When Anni arrives at the Terrano train station, she gets a ride to the hotel from Giulio (Franchot Tone), a philosophical and poetical postman who has no ambition, no desire for wealth, and is not impressed by her haughty attitude. The hotel manager greets Anni effusively: The Count has arranged everything.

The maid turns out to be Anni's old friend, Maria (Mary Philips). One day, Maria looked into a mirror and was frightened by the wrinkles and heavy makeup that foretold her “finish.” She has built a new, happy life at the hotel. Maria is suspicious of the Count and warns Anni to be careful and correct. She is horrified by Anni's beloved new evening dress, a mass of red beads. “You might as well wear a sign,” she says, grimly.

That evening, dressed in pale lace, Anni struggles with the menu and table service until a waiter helps her, discreetly. Rudi is dining with his fiancée, Maddalena Monti (Lynne Carver); her father, Admiral Monti (Reginald Owen); and the Contessa di Meina (Billie Burke). Rudi and the Admiral are both attracted to Anni. The Admiral sends her a note. Thinking it is from Rudi, she coolly tears it up. Rudi apologizes, explains, and invites her to join their party. The Admiral pretends to know her, Rudi asks her to dance, and the Contessa warns Maddalena: “Watch out!”

Rudi falls in love with Anni, mystified by the difference between her behavior at the hotel and her wild freedom in the woods. Giulio, clearly in love, is also confused.

Hoping to lure Rudi into a proposal, Anni extends her stay.

The Contessa, who has been suspicious from the beginning, wires Armalia. His reply—he had forgotten all about his experiment with the cabaret girl—comes through Giulio. On the way to deliver it, Giulio meets Anni, and they go to his cottage. She tells him a long lie about her past, and breaks down. She loves him, but marriage to Rudi would bring the life she craves. Later, she falls, and Giulio loses the telegram while helping her.

At the costume party, Anni snubs Giulio when he offers her edelweiss, a symbol of devoted love found only in remote, dangerous mountain heights. “He must have risked his life for those flowers,” the Contessa says. Rudi finally proposes, after she refuses to be his mistress. She confesses to Giulio that she loves him—but she will marry Rudi the next day because she can live without love but will never again live with hunger.

The next day, Rudi tells Maddalena that he loves Anni. She steps aside, suggesting that they dine together that evening, and then bursts into tears. While Maria helps Anni pack, Anni decides to wear the red dress. Maria tells her that she no longer has a heart and that the gaudy red is what she is really like. “You can't remember the waterfront because you are still there.”

During dinner, Giulio brings a copy of the telegram to the hotel; the bellboy delivers it to the Contessa, who shows it to the others. Maddalena is genuinely sympathetic. Anni tells Rudi that he should marry his childhood sweetheart.

Anni runs to Maria for comfort, but soon realizes that she is relieved. She leaves the hotel, taking only her peasant costume and a long cloak. Giulio is happily waiting for her.

Gallery

Cast
 Joan Crawford as Anni Pavlovitch
 Franchot Tone as Giulio
 Robert Young as Rudi Pal
 Billie Burke as Contessa di Meina
 Reginald Owen as Admiral Monti
 Lynne Carver as Maddelena Monti
 George Zucco as Count Armalia
 Mary Philips as Maria
 Paul Porcasi as Signor Nobili
 Dickie Moore as Pietro
 Frank Puglia as Alberto
 Adriana Caselotti as First Peasant Girl
 Jean Lewis as Second Peasant Girl
 Ann Rutherford as Third Peasant Girl

Reception
Howard Barnes of the New York Herald Tribune wrote,
"Joan Crawford has a glamorous field day in The Bride Wore Red.... With a new hair-do and more wide-eyed than ever, she plays at being a slattern, a fine lady, and a peasant with all of the well-known Crawford sorcery. It is not entirely her fault that she always remains herself. [The film] has no dramatic conviction and little of the comic flavor that might have made it amusing though slight. Your enjoyment of it will depend on how much of Miss Crawford you can take at one stretch.... The direction of Dorothy Arzner is always interesting and sometimes...is extraordinarily imaginative, but here she has not been able to give a vapid Cinderella pipe dream more than a handsome pictorial front."

References

External links

 
 
 
 

1937 films
1930s English-language films
American black-and-white films
Metro-Goldwyn-Mayer films
Films scored by Franz Waxman
Films based on works by Ferenc Molnár
Films directed by Dorothy Arzner
1930s romantic comedy-drama films
Films produced by Joseph L. Mankiewicz
Films with screenplays by Waldo Salt
Films set in Trieste
Films set in Italy
American romantic comedy-drama films
1937 comedy films
1937 drama films
1930s American films